Jim Speros (born February 17, 1959) is an American businessman and former American football player and coach from Great Falls, Virginia, (Fairfax County), best known for his ownership of teams in the southern American expansion phase of the Canadian Football League and United Football League.

Early career
Speros is an alumnus of Clemson University in Clemson, South Carolina. He later served as an assistant coach for the Washington Redskins (serving on the staff of the championship 1982 Washington Redskins season) and Buffalo Bills. When Speros accepted the job to serve on Joe Gibbs' staff, it made him the youngest full-time assistant coach in NFL history.

Baltimore CFL Colts/Stallions ownership

He is best known for his ownership of, and presidency over, the Baltimore CFL Colts (later known as the Baltimore Stallions), the most successful team from the Canadian football league expansion south to the United States. The Stallions' success was due in large part to Speros' involvement. He managed to build a successful franchise in Baltimore with crowds that consistently topped 30,000 at the renovated four-decade old Memorial Stadium on 33rd Street in northeast Baltimore over its two-year existence. During his time with the Stallions, Speros also served as vice commissioner of the Canadian Football League under commissioner Larry Smith.

The Stallions were a runaway success on the field as well.  He knew that Canadian football was very different from the American game, and stocked the Stallions with CFL veterans.  This approach paid off very well, as the Stallions advanced all the way to the Grey Cup final in both seasons, winning it in 1995–Baltimore's first major-sports title since the Orioles won the 1983 World Series.

However, Speros' ambitious ownership of the Stallions would not last long.  During the 1995 Grey Cup playoffs, the Cleveland Browns under long-time owner Art Modell, announced plans to move to Baltimore.  The resulting dispute ultimately resulted in the Browns' franchise being suspended for four years, while the Browns' players and personnel moved to Baltimore and were renamed as the Baltimore Ravens.  Although the Stallions had been a hit, Speros knew that they could not even begin to compete with an NFL team. Rather than face being effectively reduced to "minor league" status (as he put it years later),  Speros moved the team to Montreal to become the current incarnation of the Alouettes. However, the CFL refused to let Speros' team keep their legacy as the Stallions, though it allowed him to reclaim the history and records of the previous two incarnations of the Alouettes.  According to official CFL records, Speros is reckoned as having canceled his franchise in Baltimore and "reactivated" the dormant 1946-86 Alouettes franchise.  Speros kept the team for one more year before selling the team to Robert C. Wetenhall in early 1997, handing over the title of team president to Smith.

United Football League involvement
In May 2010, Speros rejected an overture to buy the United Football League's Florida Tuskers. In June 2010 he was named as the owner of the Virginia Destroyers, an expansion team set to begin play in Norfolk, Virginia in 2011. Speros named former Washington Redskins quarterback Doug Williams as the team's general manager. In late August 2010, Speros backed out of negotiations due to multiple flaws in the contracts presented to him as well as the league structure. Speros specifically cited the inability for him to acquire an entire franchise instead of investing in a single-entity league. However, Speros said he remained open to purchasing the team if terms changed, and that he continued to support the league's efforts in the region. Ironically, in January 2011, the league contracted the Tuskers and moved all of its staff to Virginia to form the Destroyers' core; in August 2012, the league contracted the Hartford Colonials and assigned that team's owner, Bill Mayer, as the Destroyers' owner after failing to find an owner to replace Speros.

Restaurants
Speros, who grew up in the restaurant business, is the founder and owner of several upscale sports restaurants in the Northern Virginia area. His initial concept, Velocity Five, has locations in Centreville, Sterling, and previously in Arlington. He has since founded and opened Velocity Wings, a slightly different concept that primarily features buffalo style chicken wings and burgers. These restaurants are located in South Riding and Purcellville.

In 2015, Velocity Wings launched its licensing programs in Virginia, Maryland, and the District of Columbia for its expansion.

Other

Speros served as Chairman, President and CEO of Chalk, Inc., a publicly traded company, from 2005 through 2008. He served on the Board of Directors from 2000 through 2008. Chalk, an industry leader in mobile learning management systems was sold to Research in Motion (RIM)/Blackberry in January 2009. He also served for twelve years (1998-2010) as member of the Board of Directors of Braintech, Inc., a publicly traded vision guided robotics company.

Prior to his affiliation with Chalk, Speros was President and Chief Executive Officer of Sideware Systems, Inc., a customer relationship management software company which traded publicly in the United States and Canada. Under Speros’ leadership, the company had twelve offices across North America and reached a market capitalization of $1.8 billion. Their customer list included several Fortune 500 companies.

Speros is a founding partner, owner and served as Vice Chairman of National Capital Golf Ventures, LLC, a privately held golf and real estate development company with properties in the Mid Atlantic.

In addition to his other ventures, he served as President of Champions Sports, Inc., a publicly traded restaurant corporation, from 1989 to 1993. Champion’s Sports had 37 restaurant locations nationwide before being sold to the Marriott Corporation in 1993.

Speros’ sports background also includes serving as a Partner and Chairman of the Ownership Committee for American Baseball Capital, a group vying to purchase a Major League Baseball team in the Northern Virginia region. Specifically, Arlington, Virginia. The group was a finalist and was recognized for their long dedication to bringing the "great American pastime" back to the Washington Capital region. In 2005 Major League Baseball awarded the Washington Nationals to Washington, D.C.

In August 2012, Speros was named to the Board of Directors for the Washington, D.C. based Military Bowl.

Personal life
He and his wife, Ellen, have three children. Their son, Jimmy Speros, played football for the University of Richmond. Their youngest, Justin Speros, currently attends his father's alma mater Clemson University. Justin serves as a student assistant for the Tigers football team.

Speros' father, Leo, played running back at  The University of Maryland at College Park from 1951-1954. His brothers, Pete and George, also played college football. Pete, an All-American at Penn State, was drafted by the Seattle Seahawks in the 1983 NFL Draft. George played linebacker at Temple. Speros' nephew, Chris, played alongside Jimmy at the University of Richmond.

Speros graduated from St. John's College High School, a Christian Brothers Roman Catholic high school in Washington, D.C.

References

1959 births
Living people
Montreal Alouettes owners
Montreal Alouettes team presidents
Washington Redskins coaches
United Football League (2009–2012) owners
Clemson University alumni
Buffalo Bills coaches
People from Great Falls, Virginia